Vasco may refer to:

 Basque language, called vasco in Spanish
 Vasco (album), a two-part EP by Ricardo Villalobos
 Vasco da Gama, Portuguese explorer
 Vasco da Gama, Goa, a city in India, often called simply Vasco
 Club de Regatas Vasco da Gama, a Brazilian football club
 Vasco SC, a Goan football club
 × Vascostylis or Vasco, an orchid genus
 Vasco Data Security International, a corporate security firm now known as OneSpan
 Vietnam Air Services Company, a regional airline in southern Vietnam - subsidiary of Vietnam Airlines

People with the name
 André Vasco (born 1984), Brazilian actor and television presenter
 Grão Vasco (Vasco Fernandes) (1475–1540), Portuguese painter
 María Vasco (born 1975), Spanish race walker
 Maurizio Vasco (born 1955), American television presenter
 Vasco da Gama Fernandes (1908–1991), Portuguese politician, Chairman of the Portuguese Parliament
 Vasco Gonçalves, Prime Minister of Portugal from 1974 to 1975
 Vasco Joaquim Rocha Vieira, last Portuguese Governor (1991-1999) of Macau
 Vasco Núñez de Balboa (1475-1519), a Spanish conquistador
 Vasco Rossi (born 1952), an Italian singer-songwriter

Fiction
 Jane Vasco, the lead character in the Painkiller Jane TV series

See also
 CR Vasco da Gama, a Brazilian football club
 Associação Desportiva Vasco da Gama, a Brazilian football club
 Vasco Esporte Clube, a Brazilian football club
 Vasco da Gama Bridge in Lisbon
 Vasco da Gama (South Africa), a South African football club
 Vasco da Gama Tower in Lisbon